Richard A. "Rich" Kasunic (born January 8, 1947) is a former Democratic member of the Pennsylvania State Senate who represented the 32nd District from 1995 to 2015. He was a member of the Pennsylvania House of Representatives from 1983 through 1994.

Kasunic attended Robert Morris College, receiving an associate degree in business. Two years later, he received a bachelor's degree in the same field upon graduation from Youngstown State University. Prior to running for office, Kasunic ran a small business and was a member of the Army National Guard.

External links
Senator Kasunic official caucus website
Pennsylvania State Senate - Rich Kasunic official PA Senate website

Follow the Money - Rich Kasunic
2006 2004 2002 2000 1998 campaign contributions

Pennsylvania state senators
Members of the Pennsylvania House of Representatives
1947 births
Living people